Leavins is a surname. Notable people with the surname include:

 Arthur Leavins (1917—1995), British violinist
 Chris Leavins (born 1968), Canadian actor
 Jim Leavins (born 1960), Canadian ice hockey player